Amma Rajinama (English translation: Resignation of Mother) is  a 1991 Indian Telugu film directed by Dasari Narayana Rao and cinematography by Chota K. Naidu. The Mother character is portrayed by Sharada. This is one of the movies where director Dasari touches upon women issues.

It is a Musical film with a film score composed by K. Chakravarthy. "Evaru Rayagalaru Amma Anu Maatakanna Kammani Kavyam" and "Srushitikarta Oka Brahmma…Atanini Srushitinchindoka Amma" are some of the best lyrics written about the greatness of the Mother. This movie also marks the debut of cinematographer Chota K. Naidu, who was an associate and regarded as a student of Dasari Narayana Rao. The movie was remade in Kannada as Amma (2001) starring Lakshmi in the title role.

Plot
The movie shows how a housewife and mother takes care of their children and the entire domestic work, but is unappreciated by her family. She undertakes Rajinama (Resignation) as mother to teach a lesson to her children (Saikumar and others), who eventually understand their mistake.

Cast
 Sharada
 Kaikala Satyanarayana
 Brahmanandam
 Saikumar
 Kavitha
 Dasari Narayana Rao
 Rajitha

Soundtrack

References

External links
 
Films directed by Dasari Narayana Rao
1991 films
Films scored by K. Chakravarthy
1990s Telugu-language films
Indian drama films
Telugu films remade in other languages
1991 drama films